Jones/Bronzeville, also known as 35th Street, is a station on Metra's Rock Island District line. It is located in the Bronzeville neighborhood on the South Side of Chicago, Illinois. It was named in honor of Lovana Jones who was an Illinois State Representative in the Bronzeville neighborhood.

Metra began construction on the new station in 2009 and it opened on April 3, 2011, after originally being scheduled to open in late 2010. It is located east of Guaranteed Rate Field, home of the Chicago White Sox, and also serves the nearby Illinois Institute of Technology, Chicago Police Headquarters, and De La Salle Institute.

Currently, it is the second newest station on the Metra system after  station which opened on February 5, 2018.

It is also located within walking distance of the CTA's 35th–Bronzeville–IIT station on the Green Line.

As of 2018, 35th Street is the 158th busiest of Metra's 236 non-downtown stations, with an average of 245 weekday boardings.

As of 2022, 35th Street is served as a flag stop by 37 trains in each direction on weekdays, by all 16 inbound trains and all 17 outbound trains on Saturdays, and by all 14 trains in each direction on Sundays.

Bus connections
CTA
 24 Wentworth
 31 31st
 35 31st/35th
 39 Pershing

Pace
 773 Markham/Tinley Park-Guaranteed Rate Field Express
 774 Palos Heights/Oak Lawn-Guaranteed Rate Field Express
 775 Bolingbrook/Burr Ridge-Guaranteed Rate Field Express

References

External links

35th Street/'Lou' Jones/Bronzeville Station

Metra stations in Chicago
Railway stations in the United States opened in 2011
Railway stations in Illinois at university and college campuses
Douglas, Chicago